Scheiblingstein is a mountain in Styria, Austria at an elevation of 2197m high. It is part of the Haller Mauern.

External links 

 Tourguide to Scheiblingstein with photo (german)

Mountains of Styria